The European Union Prize for Literature (EUPL), established in 2009, is a European Union literary award. Its aim is to recognise outstanding new literary talents from all over Europe, to promote the circulation and translation of literature amongst European countries, and to highlight the continent's creativity and diversity.

About the Award 
The EUPL is funded by the "Creative Europe" programme, the European Commission framework programme for support to the culture and audiovisual sectors. On the daily, the Prize is run by a Consortium of associations composed of the European Writers' Council, the Federation of European Publishers, and the European and International Booksellers Federation, with support from the European Commission. The EUPL Consortium is responsible for the setting up of national juries and the practical organisation of the EUPL award ceremony. They support the laureates in their promotion across Europe and beyond, online and at bookshops and book fairs' events.

Initial format 
Each year, national juries consisting of experts in fields of literature, publishing and bookselling are set up in a rotating third of the participating countries to the Creative Europe programme. After deciding on a shortlist of 2 to 5 books from their country's most promising writers, each jury selects its national winner. All participating countries are thus represented across cycles of three years, with the Prize awarding one winning book/author per country. The current list of participating countries include: 
The 28 Member States of the European Union (as of 2013)
The 3 EEA countries: Iceland, Liechtenstein and Norway
The candidate and potential candidate countries for accession to the EU: Albania, Bosnia and Herzegovina, Kosovo, Montenegro, North Macedonia, Serbia and Turkey.
European Neighbourhood Policy countries: Armenia, Georgia, Moldova, Tunisia and Ukraine

Revised format 
In 2022, the European Commission announced several changes in the prize's structure, indicating that from now, national organisations would make an initial selection of books, nominating one book each, and that a second round of selection conducted by a seven-member European jury would select one winner and five special mentions for the award.

In response to these changes, the European Writers' Council announced that they would withdraw participation in the prize, stating that the new format "does not promote multilingualism."

Prize 
Each laureate of the EUPL receives €5,000, and their awarded book is given support for translation, as well as promotion. An EUPL anthology is also published every year, which features excerpts from all laureates' awarded books both in original language and in an English or French translation.

Winners

2009
Winners for 2009 were announced in November 2009.

: Paulus Hochgatterer, Die Süße des Lebens
: Mila Pavićević, Djevojčica od leda i druge bajke
: Emmanuelle Pagano, Les Adolescents troglodytes
: Noémi Szécsi, Kommunista Monte Cristo
: Karen Gillece, Longshore Drift
: Daniele Del Giudice, Orizzonte mobile
: Laura Sintija Černiauskaitė, Kvėpavimas į marmurą
: Carl Frode Tiller, Innsirkling
: Jacek Dukaj, Lód
: Dulce Maria Cardoso, Os Meus Sentimentos
: Pavol Rankov, Stalo sa prvého septembra (alebo inokedy)
: Helena Henschen, I skuggan av ett brott

2010
Winners for 2010 were announced on 18 November 2010.

: Peter Terrin, De bewaker
: Myrto Azina Chronides (Μυρτώ Αζίνα Χρονίδη), Το πείραμα (To Peírama)
: Adda Djørup, Den mindste modstand
: Tiit Aleksejev, Palveränd
: Riku Korhonen, Lääkäriromaani
: Iris Hanika, Das Eigentliche
: Jean Back, Amateur
: Răzvan Rădulescu, Teodosie cel Mic
: Nataša Kramberger, Nebesa v robidah: roman v zgodbah
: Raquel Martínez-Gómez, Sombras de unicornio
: Goce Smilevski (Гоце Смилевски), Сестрата на Зигмунд Фројд

2011
Winners for 2011 were announced on 11 October 2011.
: Kalin Terziyski (Калин Терзийски), Има ли кой да ви обича (Ima li koj da vi običa)
: Tomáš Zmeškal, Milostný dopis klínovým písmem
: Kostas Hatziantoniou (Κώστας Χατζηαντωνίου), Αγκριτζέντο (Agrigento)
: Ófeigur Sigurðsson, Jón
: Inga Žolude, Mierinājums Ādama kokam
: Iren Nigg, Man wortet sich die Orte selbst
: Immanuel Mifsud, Fl-Isem tal-Missier (u tal-Iben)
: Andrej Nikolaidis, Sin
: Rodaan Al Galidi, De autist en de postduif
: Jelena Lengold, Vašarski mađioničar
: Çiler İlhan, Sürgün
: Adam Foulds, The Quickening Maze

2012
The EUPL Award Ceremony was hosted in Brussels on 22 October 2012.

: Anna Kim, Die gefrorene Zeit
: Lada Žigo, Rulet
: Laurence Plazenet, L’amour seul
: Viktor Horváth, Török tükör
: Kevin Barry, City of Bohane
: Emanuele Trevi, Qualcosa di scritto
: Giedra Radvilavičiūtė, Šiąnakt aš miegosiu prie sienos
: Gunstein Bakke, Maud og Aud. Ein roman om trafikk
: Piotr Paziński, Pensjonat
: Afonso Cruz, A Boneca de Kokoschka
: Jana Beňová, Café Hyena: Plán odprevádzania
: Sara Mannheimer, Handlingen

2013
The winners were announced on 26 September 2013. The ceremony was hosted in Brussels on 26 November 2013.

: Isabelle Wéry, Marilyn désossée
: Faruk Šehić, Knjiga o Uni
: Emilios Solomou (Αιμίλιος Σολωμού), Hμερολóγιο μιας απιστίας (Emerológio mias apistías)
: Kristian Bang Foss, Døden kører Audi
: Meelis Friedenthal, Mesilased
: Katri Lipson, Jäätelökauppias
: Marica Bodrožić, Kirschholz und alte Gefühle
: Tullio Forgiarini, Amok: Eng Lëtzebuerger Liebeschronik
: Lidija Dimkovska (Лидија Димковска), Резервен живот (Rezerven život)
: Ioana Pârvulescu, Viața începe vineri
: Gabriela Babnik, Sušna doba
: Cristian Crusat, Breve teoría del viaje y el desierto

2014
The winners were announced on 8 October 2014 at the Frankfurt Book Fair.

 : Ben Blushi, Otello, Arapi i Vlorës
 : Milen Ruskov (Милен Русков), Възвишение (Vǎzvišenie)
 : Jan Němec, Dějiny světla
 : Makis Tsitas (Μάκης Τσίτας), Μάρτυς μου ο Θεός (Mártis mou o Theós)
 : Oddný Eir, Jarðnæði
 : Jānis Joņevs, Jelgava 94
 : Armin Öhri, Die dunkle Muse: Historischer Kriminalroman
 : Pierre J. Mejlak, Dak li l-Lejl Iħallik Tgħid
 : Ognjen Spahić, Puna glava radosti
 : Marente de Moor, De Nederlandse maagd
 : Uglješa Šajtinac (Угљеша Шајтинац), Сасвим скромни дарови (Sasvim skromni darovi)
 : Birgül Oğuz, Hah
 : Evie Wyld, All the Birds, Singing

2015
The winners were announced in April 2015, at the opening ceremony of the London Book Fair by Tibor Navracsics, the European Commissioner for Education, Culture, Youth and Sport at the time.

 : Carolina Schutti, Einmal muss ich über weiches Gras gelaufen sein
 : Luka Bekavac, Viljevo
 : Gaëlle Josse, Le dernier gardien d’Ellis Island
 : Edina Szvoren, Nincs, és ne is legyen
 : Donal Ryan, The Spinning Heart
 : Lorenzo Amurri, Apnea
 : Undinė Radzevičiūtė, Žuvys ir drakonai
 : Ida Hegazi Høyer, Unnskyld
 : Magdalena Parys, Magik
 : David Machado, Índice médio de felicidade
 : Svetlana Žuchová, Obrazy zo života M.
 : Sara Stridsberg, Beckomberga: ode till min familj

2016
The winners were announced in April 2016 at the European Commission.
 : Christophe Van Gerrewey, Op de Hoogte
 : Tanja Stupar-Trifunović (Тања Ступар Трифуновић), Сатови у мајчиној соби (Satovi u majčinoj sobi)  
 : Antonis Georgiou (Αντώνης Γεωργίου), Ένα άλπουμ ιστορίες (Éna álpoum istoríes)
 : Bjørn Rasmussen, Huden er det elastiske hylster der omgiver hele legemet
 : Paavo Matsin, Gogoli disko
 : Selja Ahava, Taivaalta tippuvat asiat
 : Benedict Wells, Vom Ende der Einsamkeit
 : Gast Groeber, All Dag verstoppt en aneren
 : Claudiu M. Florian, Vârstele jocului. Strada Cetății.
 : Jasmin B. Frelih, Na/pol
 : Jesús Carrasco, La tierra que pisamos 
 : Nenad Joldeski (Ненад Јолдески), Секој со своето езеро (Sekoj so svoeto ezero)

2017
The winners were announced on 21 April 2017.

 : Rudi Erëbara, Epika e yjeve të mëngjesit
 : Ina Vultchanova (Ина Вълчанова), Остров Крах (Ostrov Krach)
 : Bianca Bellová, Jezero
 : Kallia Papadaki (Κάλλια Παπαδάκη), Δενδρίτες (Dendrítes)
 : Halldóra K. Thoroddsen, Tvöfalt gler
 : Osvalds Zebris, Gaiļu kalna ēnā
 : Walid Nabhan, L-Eżodu taċ-Ċikonji
 : Aleksandar Bečanović, Arcueil
 : Jamal Ouariachi, Een honger
 : Darko Tuševljaković, Jaz
 : Sine Ergün, Baştankara
 : Sunjeev Sahota, The Year of the Runaways

2018
In 2018, the European Union Prize for Literature (EUPL) celebrated its 10th anniversary. To mark this special occasion, the EUPL organised a writing contest exclusively open to all previous 108 EUPL winners.
The EUPL Anniversary Edition (a short fiction competition) celebrated 5 winners: 
 : Jean Back, Europäesch Wolleken
 : Lidija Dimkovska (Лидија Димковска), Кога заминав од „Карл Либкнехт“ (Koga zaminav od „Karl Liebknecht“)
 : Gast Groeber, Aktuelle Wetterwarnung: überwiegend dichter Nebel
 : Jelena Lengold, Jasmin i smrt
 : Ioana Pârvulescu, O voce

2019
The winners were announced on 24 May 2019.
 : Laura Freudenthaler, Geistergeschichte
 : Piia Leino, Taivas
 : Sophie Daull, Au grand lavoir
 : Réka Mán-Várhegyi, Mágneshegy
 : Beqa Adamashvili (ბექა ადამაშვილი), ამ რომანში ყველა კვდება (am romanshi q’vela k’vdeba)
 : Nikos Chryssos (Νίκος Χρυσός), Καινούργια μέρα (Kainourgia mera) 
 : Jan Carson, The Firestarters 
 : Giovanni Dozzini, E Baboucar guidava la fila
 : Daina Opolskaitė, Dienų piramidės 
 : Marta Dzido, Frajda
 : Tatiana Țîbuleac, Grădina de sticlă
 : Ivana Dobrakovová, Matky a kamionisti
 : Haska Shyyan (Гаська Шиян), За спиною (Za spynoju)
 : Melissa Harrison, All Among the Barley

2020
The winners were announced on 19 May 2020.

 : Nathalie Skowronek, La carte des regrets
 : Lana Bastašić, Uhvati zeca
 : Maša Kolanović, Poštovani kukci i druge jezive priče
 : Stavros Christodoulou (Σταύρος Χριστοδούλου), Τη μέρα που πάγωσε ο ποταμός (Te méra pou págose o potamós)
 : Asta Olivia Nordenhof, Penge på lommen
 : Mudlum, Poola poisid
 : Matthias Nawrat, Der traurige Gast
 : Shpëtim Selmani, Libërthi i dashurisë
 : Francis Kirps, Die Mutationen
 : Stefan Bošković, Ministar
 : Petar Andonovski (Петар Андоновски), Страв од варвари (Strav od varvari)
 : Maria Navarro Skaranger, Bok om sorg
 : Irene Solà, Canto jo i la muntanya balla

2021 
The winners were announced on 18 May 2021.

 : Tom Kuka, Flama
 : Aram Pachyan (Արամ Պաչյան), P/F
 : Georgi Bardarov (Георги Бърдаров), Absolvo te
 : Lucie Faulerová, Smrtholka
 : Sigrún Pálsdóttir, Delluferðin
 : Laura Vinogradova, Upe
 : Lara Calleja, Kissirtu kullimkien
 : Gerda Blees, Wij zijn licht
 : Frederico Pedreira, A Lição do Sonâmbulo
 : Dejan Tiago Stanković, Zamalek
 : Anja Mugerli, Čebelja družina
 : Maxim Grigoriev, Europa
 : Amine Al Ghozzi (أمين الغزي), زندالي ليلة 14 جانفي 2011 (zindali laylat 14 janfi 2011)

2022 
The 2022 edition introduced a change in the organisation of the Prize. For the first time, a seven-member European jury awarded one overall winner for this edition, accompanied by five special mentions.

Winner:
 : Iva Pezuashvili (ივა ფეზუაშვილი), ბუნკერი (bunk’eri)

Special mentions:
 : Gaea Schoeters, Trofee
 : Slađana Nina Perković, U jarku
 : Tadhg Mac Dhonnagáin, Madame Lazare
 : Jacobo Bergareche, Los días perfectos
 : Yevhenia Kuznietsova (Євгенія Кузнєцова), Спитайте Мієчку (Spytajte Miječku)

Translations 
The European Union promotes the transnational circulation of literature and its diversity in Europe and beyond. The list below shows a sample of the list of EUPL awarded books available in an English translation:

 Selja Ahava, Things that fall from the sky, Oneworld Publications, 2015
 Petar Andonovski, Fear of Barbarians, Parthian Books, 2021
 Gabriela Babnik, Dry Season, Istros Books, 2012
 Lana Bastašić, Catch the Rabbit, Picador, 2021
 Bianca Bellová, The Lake, Parthian Books, 2022
 Jana Beňová, Seeing People Off, Two Dollar Radio, 2017
 Dulce Maria Cardoso, Violeta Among the Stars, MacLehose Press, 2020
 Laura Sintija Cerniauskaité, Breathing into Marble, Noir Press, 2017
 Myrto Azina Chronides, The Experiment, Garnet Pub Ltd, 2012
 Cristian Crusat, A Brief Theory of Travel and the Desert, Hispabooks Pub, 2016
 Afonso Cruz, Kokoschka's Doll, MacLehose Press, 2020
 Lidija Dimkovska, A Spare Life, Two Lines Press, 2016
 Oddný Eir, Land of Love and Ruins, Restless Books, 2016
 Jasmin B. Frelih, In/Half, Oneworld Pubns, 2018
 Iris Hanika, The Bureau of Past Management, V&Q Books, 2021
 Paulus Hochgatterer, The Sweetness of Life, MacLehose Press, 2006
 Çiler İlhan, Exile, Istros Books, 2015
 Jānis Joņevs, Doom 94, Wrecking Ball Press, 2018
 Gaëlle Josse, The Last Days of Ellis Island, World Edtns Llc, 2020
 Anna Kim, Frozen Time, Ariadne Press, 2008
 Jelena Lengold, Fairground Magician, Istros Books, 2013
 Katri Lipson, The Ice Cream Man, Amazon Crossing, 2012
 David Machado, The Shelf Life of Happiness, Amazon Crossing, 2016
 Paavo Matsin, The Gogol Disco, Dalkey Archive Press, 2020
 Immanuel Mifsud, In the Name of the Father (and of the Son), Parthian Books, 2019
 Marente de Moor, The Dutch Maiden, World Editions International, 2016
 Andrej Nikolaidis, The Son, Istros Books, 2013
 Birgül Oğuz, Hah, World Editions International, 2016
 Emmanuelle Pagano, One Day I’ll Tell You Everything, Text Publishing, 2020
 Ioana Pârvulescu, Life Begins on Friday, Istros Books, 2016
 Piotr Paziński, The Boarding House, Dalkey Archive, 2018
 Faruk Šehić, Quiet Flows the Una, Istros Books, 2016
 Irene Solà, When I Sing, Mountains Dance, Graywolf Press, 2022
 Goce Smilevski, Freud's Sister, Penguin Books, 2012
 Ognjen Spahić, A Head Full of Joy, Dalkey Archive Press, 2018
 Peter Terrin, The Guard, MacLehose Press, 2012
 Carl Frode Tiller, Encircling, Graywolf Press, 2017
 Emanuele Trevi, Something written, World Editions International, 2016
 Makis Tsitas, God Is My Witness, Aiora Books, 2019
 Benedict Wells, The End of Loneliness, Sceptre, 2018
 Tomáš Zmeškal, Love Letter in Cuneiform, Yale University Press, 2008

References

External links
 official website

Awards established in 2009
Fiction awards
European literary awards
Belgian literary awards
European Union
2009 establishments in the European Union